Niki Gavera (born 15 April 1967) is a Greek athlete. She competed in the women's high jump at the 1992 Summer Olympics.

References

1967 births
Living people
Athletes (track and field) at the 1992 Summer Olympics
Greek female high jumpers
Olympic athletes of Greece
Athletes from Athens
Mediterranean Games silver medalists for Greece
Mediterranean Games medalists in athletics
Athletes (track and field) at the 1991 Mediterranean Games